Chief Wawatam (nicknamed the Chief) was a coal-fired steel ship that was based, for most of its 1911–1984 working life, in St. Ignace, Michigan.  The vessel was named after a distinguished Ojibwa chief of the 1760s.  In initial revenue service, the Chief Wawatam served as a train ferry, passenger ferry and icebreaker that operated year-round at the Straits of Mackinac between St. Ignace and Mackinaw City, Michigan.  During the winter months, it sometimes took many hours to cross the five-mile-wide Straits, and Chief Wawatam was fitted with complete passenger hospitality spaces.

Chief Wawatam's work began to change in the 1940s. Its role as an icebreaker stationed in the upper Great Lakes was supplanted in 1944 by USCGC Mackinaw, a U.S. Coast Guard icebreaker. The ship's passenger traffic dropped off in the years following World War II. The remaining passenger service ended with the completion of the Mackinac Bridge in 1957 that connected the Upper and Lower peninsulas of the U.S. state of Michigan.

Chief Wawatam then entered upon the final phase of its revenue services, being exclusively used to shuttle railroad freight cars across the Straits. The  two railroad docks that were used in Mackinaw City and in St. Ignace survive. USCGC Mackinaw, now a ship museum, is berthed at the railroad dock in Mackinaw City and a wooden statue of Chief Wawatam stands nearby at its harbor. The Wawatam Lighthouse guards the railroad dock at St. Ignace.

History

Railroad ferry
Chief Wawatam was designed by Great Lakes marine architect Frank E. Kirby. It was launched in Toledo, Ohio, by the Toledo Shipbuilding Company on 26 August 1911.  It was a replacement for St. Ignace, a wooden vessel built in 1888. The new steel ship, at the time of construction, was said to have been the largest ice crusher in the world. It started servicing the Mackinac Transportation Company on 18 October 1911. The company was a joint venture of Duluth, South Shore and Atlantic Railway, Grand Rapids and Indiana Railroad, and Michigan Central Railroad. The three railroads crossed back and forth at the Straits of Mackinac.

Chief Wawatam could carry 18 to 26 railroad cars depending on their sizes and they were on rails bolted to the ferry ship's deck. The vessel had similarly designed steam engines as the Titanic.  After a post-1945 refit, it would have a steering gear taken from a World War II destroyer. The first part of Chief Wawatam's history is that while its main purpose was as a train service to carry railroad cars, it also carried regular passenger train cars, automobiles, military personnel, and people for cruising. The cruising passengers had a lounge with oak seats. The ship's name was often shortened to just the Chief in common usage.

Year-round train ferry service at the Straits of Mackinac was a significant challenge because of the heavy ice buildup experienced by these straits in winter.  Chief Wawatam was designed to break ice with her bow propeller, which could both propel the boat and take water out from underneath the ice to allow it to be broken through by force of gravity from the weight of the ship. The ice-crushing railroad ferry was used in various instances to break open a channel for other freighters to pass through.

Chief Wawatam was 338 feet in length and had a beam of 62 feet. Her three propellers, two in the stern and one on the bow, were driven by coal-fired triple-expansion steam engines producing 6,000 horsepower. The vessel is believed to have been the last hand-fired, coal-burning boat in commercial service on the Great Lakes. Other coal-burning vessels that survived longer in revenue service, such as the ferry Badger, had automatic stokers.

Name
The vessel was originally called Hull Number 119 but was soon thereafter named for Chief Wawatam, an Ojibwa chief of the 1700s who, in the Ojibwa fighting outbreak at Fort Michilimackinac in 1763, rescued the Englishman fur trader Alexander Henry. In 1761, Henry had been the first English-speaking fur trader to establish himself as a merchant at Michilimackinac.  At that time Henry became a close friend and kinship relation of a Chippewa chief named Wa'wa'tam, and Henry later claimed that he and Wawatam had become blood brothers by the power of the Great Spirit. This gave Chief Wawatam an enduring place in Straits of Mackinac folklore.  A wooden statue of Chief Wawatam stands near the harbor in Mackinaw City, Michigan, in Wawatam Park. It was carved by Jerry Prior from a white pine log that was a hundred years old.

Objective historical records partly confirm Henry's story.  After initial cordialities in 1761–1762 between the British and the local tribe of Chippewa, relations had deteriorated sharply in 1763.  The change was associated with anti-British organizational work among the Native Americans, led by the Odawa war leader Pontiac in southeastern Michigan.  On June 2, 1763, as part of the larger conflict with the British Army, a group of Indians staged a ruse to gain entrance to the fort. Upon entering the fort the Chippewa killed most of the British soldiers and fur traders.  Fur trader Henry had developed a kinship relationship with Wawatam during the 1761–1762 truce, and even as the fort fell Wawatam retained his rights and responsibilities as a kin. Henry found himself secreted in a Mackinac Island limestone hollow, Skull Cave, as an uncomfortable but safe fugitive. Henry later paid tribute to his rescuer in his published memoirs, leading to Wawatam's elevation as a legendary figure in the Straits of Mackinac.

Life of the crew

Sleeping quarters
Chief Wawatam's could carry up to 348 passengers and had a hotel services staff of 30 people in addition to the 24 crew members that just operated the vessel. That made a full crew of 54 people who had their own sleeping quarters that consisted of bunk beds stacked four high. Later in the history as a cruise ship these four high stacked bunk beds were made into two high bunk beds. Sometimes the lower bunk bed was three mattress thick and they developed a deep valley from usage. The officers of the ship had their own sleeping quarters that were luxurious.

Eating area
During the height of Chief Wawatam's passenger history the vessel had maids, cooks, and porters. The main eating gallery was closed in 1966 and the normal included meals then came from home in lunch buckets. There were two eating areas for the crew and a separate dining room for the ship's captain and his officers. The food prepared in all three eating areas was the same daily, however the service in the dining room was better. The main meal of the day was at noon. An experienced cook had to bake the pies before the boat was loaded on the back and forth trips.

Misc
Most of the crew of Chief Wawatam were from the city of St. Ignace in the Upper Peninsula of Michigan. They knew each other as local residents and close friends. During times of distress and illness they would cover each other's work time. The pilot house crew as well as the engine room crew recorded logs of their work times. It was the purser officer that kept track of and ordered all the supplies for the ship.

There was always a lot of cleaning to do on the various parts of the ship. In addition laundry was a time consuming chore with a home-devised washing machine that was run by unique mechanics powered off the ships engine. The washed clothes were then hung on a line strung over the warm engine room for drying.

Relics

Chief Wawatam was the only railroad connection between the two peninsulas of Michigan and transported across the Straits of Mackinac over 30,000 railroad cars per year in the 1950s. The carrier was also used to move freight supplies and automobiles across the Straits during its first fifty years of service. The vessel's business began to change during the 1940s. In 1944, USCGC Mackinaw, a U.S. Coast Guard icebreaker powered by diesel engines, supplanted the previously vital service of Chief Wawatam as an icebreaker stationed in the upper Great Lakes.

Passenger train ticket sales declined in the years following World War II and the use of Chief Wawatam for passenger service dwindled. With the completion of the I-75 Mackinac Bridge in 1957, remaining passenger train service ended. Chief Wawatam entered upon the final phase of its initial revenue services, being exclusively used then to shuttle railroad freight cars across the Straits. This service ended in 1984, when Chief Wawatam was laid up for four years in Mackinaw City. The ship was then sold to Purvis Marine Ltd for $110,000, refusing less money from others who wanted to turn it into a tourist attraction. It was taken to Sault Ste. Marie, Ontario, in 1989 and broken down to serve as a barge.

It was reported at the end of 2009 that Chief Wawatam barge was being scrapped. One of the ship's triple-expansion engines was saved and after being restored to operating condition was placed on display at Wisconsin Maritime Museum in Manitowoc, Wisconsin. Other artifacts from the ferry, including the whistle, wheel, telegraphs, and furniture are preserved by Mackinac Island State Park Commission in Mackinaw City. The original vessel was part of one of the last survivor ships of the Great Storm of 1913.

Legacy
 Chief Wawatam was added to the Michigan Register of Historic Sites in 1981.
 Wawatam Park, located next to the marina in St. Ignace, Michigan is named for Chief Wawatam and its Odawa namesake.
 
 Wawatam Lighthouse, a  octagonal structure with lantern and gallery in St. Ignace, Michigan, located at the far end of the former railroad ferry pier was used by Chief Wawatam.

See also

Old Mackinac Point Light
USCGC Mackinaw (WAGB-83)
Wawatam, the ship's Odawa Indian namesake
Wawatam Lighthouse

References

Sources

Further reading
Hilton, George W. (December, 2003)  Great Lakes Car Ferries Montevallo Historical Press, Incorporated (240 Pages)  ; ; 
Zimmermanm, Karl (1993) Lake Michigan's Railroad Car Ferries Andover, New Jersey. Andover Junction Publications (pages=52–63),

External links
 Chief Wawatam site

1911 ships
Michigan Central Railroad
Ferries of Michigan
Great Lakes ships
Rail transportation in Michigan
Steamships of the United States
Train ferries
Transportation in Cheboygan County, Michigan
Transportation in Mackinac County, Michigan
Ships built by the Toledo Shipbuilding Company